Bettina Heinen-Ayech (3 September 1937 – 7 June 2020) was a German painter. She became known for her colorful landscape views of Algeria.

Between 1955 and 2017 she had many exhibitions worldwide and won several prizes.

Heinen-Ayech died on 7 June 2020.

Biography
Bettina Heinen was the daughter of the in Bauchem, Germany born journalist Johann Jakob Josef "Hanns" Heinen (1895-1961). For many years he was editor-in-chief of the Solinger Tageblatt and the industry newspaper Eberswalder Offertenblatt. He was also active as a lyricist and playwright.[2] Her mother Erna Steinhoff-Heinen (1898-1969), was born in Düsseldorf and came from a westphalian family from the Soest area. [3] Bettina Heinen had three siblings, two brothers and a sister; the children grew up in a Solingen, Germany home characterized by art and openness.[4] The family lived in an old half-timbered house in the district of Höhscheid, former pit for a lead mine there, which Heinen continued to live in during stays in her hometown until her old age.[5][6]

During the World War II, Bettina Heinen lived with her mother and sister in Kreuzthal-Eisenbach near Isny in Allgäu from 1942, later joined by the painter and family friend Erwin Bowien (1899-1972), who had returned to Germany in 1942 after a ten-year stay in the Netherlands and was on constant flight from Nazi authorities. Her father Hanns Heinen followed in 1944, after publishing an article on the real state of Germany. Warrants for him and Bowien arrest arrived in Kreuzthal, which "tore the postmistress apart," as Heinen later said.[7]

From 1948 to 1954, Bettina went to Solingen's August Dicke Girls' High School, where a teacher recognized and encouraged her talent. She received her first artistic training from Bowien, who remained her mentor until his death.[3] From 1954 she visited the Cologne Werkschulen and there Otto Gerster's class for monumental mural painting, during which she was given three preliminary classes.[8] In 1955 works by Bettina Heinen - 20 watercolors and drawings - were exhibited for the first time in the Kursaal in Bad Homburg. Paintings by the then 18-year-old Bettina Heinen were included by the Frankfurt gallery owner Hanna Bekker vom Rath in the group exhibition Deutsche Kunst der Gegenwart (1955/56), in which they were shown alongside artworks by Karl Schmidt-Rottluff, Paul Klee, Max Beckmann, Max Ernst, Ernst Ludwig Kirchner, and Käthe Kollwitz on a tour to South America, Africa, and Asia. Schmidt-Rottluff advised her, "Bettina, stay true to yourself!"[4]

This was followed by studies with Hermann Kaspar at the Munich Art Academy and journey to Ticino in Switzerland. From 1958 Bettina studied at the Royal Danish Academy of Art in Copenhagen and made the first of several trips to Norway, where she bought a hut at the foot of the Seven Sisters.[8] In 1959 and 1962 Bettina Heinen received grants from the Ministry of Culture of Nordrhein-Westfalen. This was followed by painting stays on Sylt, in Ticino and Norway, as well as in Paris. In 1962 Bettina Heinen made her first trip to North Africa, when she was invited to Cairo by the German Cultural Institute.[8] She was also invited to the German Cultural Institute in Cairo.

In Paris, Bettina met her future husband, the Algerian Abdelhamid Ayech (1926-2010), at the Jardin du Luxembourg in 1960, when she was there painting with Bowien. Two years after the birth of daughter Diana in 1961, the family moved to Guelma, Ayech's hometown in Algeria, which had since become independent from France. Her Son Haroun was born in 1969. [9] In the decades that followed, Bettina Heinen-Ayech switched between Solingen and Algeria, where she became a familiar sight in search of subjects in her car, "a vehicle that was once a R4," with "the inevitable cigarette holder in the corner of her mouth."[10] Her love for Algeria was also based on her love for her husband Hamid, a "free and courageous man," according to Heinen.[11]

In 1968 Bettina Heinen-Ayech's first works were purchased by the National Museum in Algiers (Musée National des beaux-arts d'Alger), and in 1976 she was awarded the Grand Prix de la ville d'Alger. In the same year she became president of the Circle of Friends of Erwin Bowien (Bowien had died in 1972). In 1992, a retrospective of 120 of her paintings was exhibited at the Musée National des beaux-arts d'Alger. In 1993 she received the cultural award of the Solingen civic foundation Baden. In 2004, a second large retrospective of her works was shown in Algiers, the exhibition was under the patronage of the then Algerian Minister of Culture, Khalida Toumi; in 2006, Bettina was again honored by the Algerian government. In the same year, during her absence, her house in Solingen was broken into; six paintings by Erwin Bowien were deliberately stolen.[12]

Until 2018, Heinen-Ayech's paintings had been shown in over 100 solo and numerous group exhibitions in Europe, America, and in Africa.[13] Her first name "Bettina" was established as her artist name, also in the Arabic spelling بتينا.[5][14][15] Bettina Heinen-Ayech's life and work have been published in books and films. In 2012, she returned for the first time after the war to Kreuzthal in the Allgäu region of Germany, and was accompanied by a television crew from Bayerischer Rundfunk.[16]

Bettinia Heinen-Ayech died in Munich on June 7, 2020, at the age of 82. In 2020, a memorial plaque to her and her friends from an artists' colony was erected at the house where she grew up, known as the "Black House."[6]

Work

Bettina Heinen-Ayech learned all techniques of painting, but puts her emphasis on watercolor painting. As an outdoor painter she created numerous landscapes, more rarely portraits. Through her stays in Algeria, she developed her own technique: because of the dry air in Guelma, the watercolors there would not run into each other as in Europe, but dry quickly. From this she developed her own approach: "I put the strong colors together like a mosaic, color stroke by color stroke," says Bettina Heinen-Ayech. When combined, the intense colors create a vivid image of the landscapes and light in Algeria.[17] During the years of terrorism in the 1990s through the 2000s, she said, she was only able to paint portraits, still lifes, and after looking out of the window in Algeria because she was unable to travel around.[18] In Algeria, however, Heinen-Ayech was not able to paint portraits or still lifes.

In Algeria, however, not only her technique changed, but also her personality, according to Bettina Heinen-Ayech. She moved away from her "European prejudices" and "listened" to the beautiful nature in Guelma: "The southern mountain, the Mahouna, its fields, captivate and captivate all my senses and preserve my fantasies. I paint this region in spring, while the green of the fields dotted with red - poppies - glows in all its tones, far from the dense green of Europe; in summer, when its blue and purple peaks rise above the wonderful gold of its wheat fields; in winter, when the red of the earth has an incredible power that is so difficult to represent!"[17]

In 1967, journalist Max Metzker wrote about Bettina Heinen-Ayech in the Düsseldorfer Nachrichten: "She is able to make a landscape accessible even to those who do not know it. The portraits are not only images of people, but at the same time descriptions of the soul that plumb the depths."[19]

Exhibitions (selection)
• 1955 Kursaal of Bad Homburg

• 1957 North Frisia Museum. Nissenhaus Husum; Copenhagen, German Club

• 1958 Guelph Castle Münden

• 1961 Bern, Gallery Schneider

• 1962 Cairo, German Cultural Institute

• 1963 Solingen, German Blade Museum

• 1966 Düsseldorf, International Educational Institute Die Brücke

• 1970 Tunis, exhibition at the Salon des Arts

• 1972 Hamburg, Gallery for Contemporary Art

• 1973 Springe, Museum at Burghof; Rabat, Goethe Institute; Casablanca, Goethe Institute

• 1976 Gladbeck, Museum Schloss Wittringen

• 1980 Remscheid, Municipal Museum, Museum of Local History Museum Hasten

• 1984 Damascus, Goethe-Institut; The National Museum Damascus makes purchases; Aleppo, Musée National

• 1986 El Oued, Maison de la Culture

• 1990 Würzburg, Otto-Richter-Halle, Freunde Mainfränkischer Kunst und Geschichte e. V.; Paris, Centre Culturel Algérien

• 1992 Arundel, Little Gallery

• 1993 Algiers, Large retrospective with over 120 paintings at the Musée National des Beaux Arts d'Alger. The museum makes purchases

• 1998 Solingen, August-Dicke-Gymnasium, for its 125th anniversary

• 2000 Solingen, Baden Art Museum; Paris, City Hall

• 2002 Algiers, German-Algerian Society

• 2003 Aachen, Centre Culturel Français in the framework of the Algerian cultural year in France

• 2004 Algiers, second large retrospective of 100 paintings at the National Museum of Algiers under the patronage of the Minister of Culture Khalida Toumi

• 2008 Angers, Angers Castle

• 2017 Georgsmarienhütte, Museum Villa Stahmer

Honors
• 1976 Bettina Heinen-Ayech receives the Grand Prix de la ville d'Alger

• 1993 Culture prize of the Bürgerstiftung Baden, Solingen

• 1998 The city of Constantine in Algeria honors the artist with a Prix d'honneur

• 2003 Algerian State Prize, presented by the Minister of Culture, Mrs. Khalida Toumi, as a tribute to the artist's entire body of work

• 2006 Official honor by the Algerian Ministry of Culture

Publications
• (editor) Hanns Heinen: From the Fullness of Life. Poems. U-Form, Solingen

• (editor) Erwin Bowien: The Beautiful Game between Spirit and World - My Painter's Life. ISBN 3-88234-101-7
 
• (editor) Erwin Bowien. Catalog Raisonné - List of works, U-Form, Solingen 1999, ISBN 3-88234-103-3

Literature
• Eduard Fallet-von Castelberg: Bettina Heinen, Kleiner, Bern 1967 (German/French)

• Ali Elhadj-Tahar/Hans Karl Pesch: Bettina Heinen-Ayech. U-Form Verlag, Solingen 1982

• Marianne Kopatz: Bettina Heinen-Ayech, Watercolors and Drawings from Algeria. Published by: Stadtsparkasse Solingen. 1985

• Malika Bouabdellah/Diana Millies/Bernard Zimmermann: Bettina Heinen-Ayech Retrospective 1951–1992. Ed.: Stadtsparkasse Solingen, 1992

• Malika Bouabdellah: "Bettina" Catalogue for the retrospective at the Musée National des Beaux-Arts, 1993

• Hans Karl Pesch: Bettina, Collection Klaus Wiens. 1999, ISBN 3-88234-106-8 [transfer title to Citavi project using this ISBN]

• Dalila Mahammed Orfali: "Bettina". Catalog for the retrospective at the Musée National des Beaux-Arts, 2005

• Taieb Larak: Bettina, la rencontre d'un peintre et d'un pays. Bettina Heinen-Ayech et l'Algérie, 2007
    
• Ali Elhadj-Tahar/Dr. Haroun Ayech: "Bettina". Galerie Dar El Kenz, Alger, 2016.

• Taieb Larak, Bettina. Die Begegnung einer Malerin mit einer Landschaft. Bettina Heinen-Ayech und Algerien. En-Nakhla, Algier, 2018, (ISBN 978-9947-0-5382-9)

• Dr. Claudia Schöning-Kalender; Bettina Heinen-Ayech: Bewegung, Farbe, Licht. Das Künstlerische Vermächtnis einer Malerin. Art Profil, Magazin für Kunst, Heft-Nr. 144-2021

Movies
• 1992 Bettina Heinen-Ayech, Lettre à Erwin Bowien, artist portrait. Hassan Bouabdellah, Visualis Production, Algiers 1992. German version : Bettina Heinen-Ayech, Letter to Erwin Bowien. Visualis Production in collaboration with Avalon Film+TV-Produktion, Solingen 1992

• 2002 Bettina Heinen-Ayech, Hymne à la nature. Boualem Aissaoui, CYM Audiovisuel, Algiers

• 2010 Vanishing Point in the Allgäu - The Art of Memory, Erwin Bowien in the Kreuzthal. 2015, Bavarian Radio, Director: Georg Bayerle

External links
• Commons: Bettina Heinen-Ayech - Collection of Images, Videos and Audio Files

• Images of Bettina Heinen-Ayech's works at www.bettina-heinen-ayech.com

• Bettina Heinen-Ayech - protagonist of the artists' colony "Black House" at www.schwarzes-haus.com

• Bettina Heinen-Ayech Foundation - Foundation for Art, Culture and International Dialogue at www.bettina-heinen-ayech-foundation.com

• Barbara & Detlef Rahlf: Bettina Heinen-Ayech, In: bettina-heinen-ayech.com, October 10, 2008, accessed November 3, 2018

• Lokalzeit Bergisches Land: Bettina Heinen-Ayech - the Algerian painter from Solingen. In: ardmediathek.de, December 28, 2017, retrieved November 3, 2018

• Catalogue of the German National Library

References

1. Vetter: Bettina Heynen-Ayech: Painter Bettina Heinen-Ayech has died at the age of 82. In: rp-online.de. June 10, 2020, retrieved June 13, 2020

2. Johann Jakob Josef ("Hanns") and Bettina Heinen. In: archive.nrw.de. September 3, 1937, retrieved November 2, 2018

3. Barbara & Detlef Rahlf: Bettina Heinen-Ayech - Vita I. In: bettina-heinen-ayech.de. October 10, 2008, retrieved November 2, 2018

4. Barbara & Detlef Rahlf, Munich: Bettina Heinen-Ayech. In: bettina-heinen-ayech.com. October 10, 2008, retrieved November 3, 2018

5. art must open new windows. In: solinger-tageblatt.de. September 3, 1937, retrieved November 9, 2018

6. Philipp Müller: "Das Schwarze Haus": plaque honors cultural heritage. In: Solinger Tageblatt. 12 November 2020, retrieved 12 November 2020

7. communications of the Freundeskreis Erwin Bowien e. V. December 2010

8. Barbara & Detlef Rahlf: Bettina Heinen-Ayech - Vita II. In: bettina-heinen-ayech.com. October 10, 2008, retrieved November 2, 2018

9. Barbara & Detlef Rahlf: Bettina Heinen-Ayech - Vita III. In: bettina-heinen-ayech.com. October 10, 2008, accessed November 2, 2018

10. Diana Millies, "Not Degrading Nature to a Motif." The Cosmogony of the Painter Bettina Heinen-Ayech. In: Malika Bouabdellah/Diana Millies/Bernard Zimmermann (eds.): Bettina Heinen-Ayech Retrospective 1951–1992. Stadtsparkasse Solingen, Solingen 1992, p. 4.

11. Farida Hamadou: Bettina Heinen-Ayech, 50ans à Guelma : l'amour, l'Algérie... In: mtissage.wordpress.com. February 4, 2013, accessed November 6, 2018 (French).

12. solingen: Stolen property art. In: Rp Online. 2 October 2006, retrieved 11 November 2018.

13. Algeria as a source of inspiration for painter Bettina Heinen-Ayech. In: Maghreb Magazine. December 28, 2017, retrieved November 3, 2018.

14. bouabdellah, "Bettina," book cover.

15. الرئيسي: بتينا... فنانة ألمانية انصهر&. In: albayan.ae. October 10, 2014, retrieved November 15, 2018 (Arabic).

16. Johannes Rauenker: Bayerischer Rundfunk shoots a film in the Kreuzthal. In: schwaebische.de. October 11, 2012, retrieved November 3, 2018

17. Bettina-Heinen-Ayech exposera à Dar El Kenz. Femme-lumière, femme-courage. In: dzairnews.com. May 17, 2011, accessed November 3, 2018

1937 births
2020 deaths
People from Solingen
20th-century German painters
21st-century German painters
20th-century German women artists
21st-century German women artists
German women painters